Saint-Luc-de-Vincennes is a municipality in the Mauricie region of the province of Quebec in Canada. It is the seat of the RCM of Les Chenaux.

Demographics
Population trend:
 Population in 2011: 591 (2006 to 2011 population change: 6.9%)
 Population in 2006: 553
 Population in 2001: 609
 Population in 1996: 623
 Population in 1991: 618

Private dwellings occupied by usual residents: 261 (total dwellings: 273)

Mother tongue:
 English as first language: 2.7%
 French as first language: 93.6%
 English and French as first language: 0%
 Other as first language: 3.7%

References

Incorporated places in Mauricie
Municipalities in Quebec
Les Chenaux Regional County Municipality